Yeşilsırt can refer to:

 Yeşilsırt, Bitlis
 Yeşilsırt, Dicle